Potentilla indica known commonly as mock strawberry, Indian-strawberry, or false strawberry, often referred to as a backyard strawberry, mainly in North America, is a flowering plant in the family Rosaceae. It has foliage and an aggregate accessory fruit similar to that of a true strawberry. It has yellow flowers, unlike the white or slightly pink flowers of true strawberries. It is native to eastern and southern Asia, but has been introduced to many other areas as a medicinal and an ornamental plant, subsequently naturalizing in many regions worldwide.

Many sources consider this plant part of the genus Potentilla due to evidence from chloroplast genetic sequence data that the genus Duchesnea is included within Potentilla, though some still list it as Duchesnea indica.

Description

The leaves are trifoliate, roughly veined beneath, dark green, and often persisting through the winter, arising from short crowns. The plant spreads along creeping stolons, rooting and producing crowns at each node. The yellow flowers are produced in mid spring, then sporadically throughout the growing season. The aggregate accessory fruits are white or red, and entirely covered with red achenes, simple ovaries, each containing a single seed.

Uses
The fresh berries are edible but considered less palatable than proper strawberries.

References

Potentilla
Flora of temperate Asia
Flora of tropical Asia
Taxa named by Henry Cranke Andrews